The Cuckoo may refer to:
 The Cuckoo (film), a Russian film
 The Cuckoo (novel), a Japanese novel
 "The Cuckoo" (song), a folk song

See also
 Cuckoo (disambiguation)
 The Cuckoos (disambiguation)